Petra is a female black swan which first appeared on the headlines of German and international media between 2006 and 2008, after it appeared that she fell in love with a pedalo looking like a swan on the Aasee, a lake located in Münster, in Germany. 

Petra disappeared at the beginning of January 2009. Citizens and medias took action to try to find her.

The story of Petra inspired the writing of a book for children, Ebonys Traum, published in 2011. 

Petra was seen again during Spring 2013, in Osnabrück, with a new partner, this time an animal.

See also
 List of individual birds

References 

Münster
Individual waterfowl